"Moving Too Fast" is a song by British electronic duo Supafly Inc. It was released in September 2006 as a single and reached the top 30 in the UK.

The song heavily samples "Another Day in Paradise" by Phil Collins.

Charts

Weekly charts

Year-end charts

References

2006 singles
2006 songs
Supafly songs
Songs written by Phil Collins
Universal Music Group singles